The first family of the United States is the family of the president of the United States, who is both head of state and head of government of the United States. Members of the first family consist of the president, the first lady of the United States, and any of their children. However, other close relatives of the president and first spouse, such as parents, grandchildren, stepchildren, and in-laws, may be classified as members of the first family if they reside in the Executive Residence of the White House Complex.

In the United States, the term "first family" in casual reference to the president's immediate family, is most often used by the media and in particular, the White House press corps. Individually, each member of the first family is designated a Secret Service codename by the United States Secret Service. Used by special agents, these code names uniquely identify members of the first family for their ongoing protection as well as for the sake of brevity, clarity and tradition.

List

See also

Adams family
Bush family
Harrison family
Roosevelt family
United States presidential pets

References

 
 **
 
Political families of the United States